Gymnophallidae is a family of trematodes in the order Plagiorchiida.

Genera
Bartolius Cremonte, 2001
Gymnophalloides Fujita in Dollfus, 1925
Gymnophallus Odhner, 1900
Parvatrema Cable, 1953
Pseudogymnophallus Hoberg, 1981

References

Plagiorchiida
Trematode families